The Now Tour is a concert tour by American R&B singer Maxwell, in support of his multi-platinum selling album Now. The tour started in North America on August 13, 2001, in New York City at the Irving Plaza with additional dates through October. The itinerary included multiple dates in Washington, D.C., Atlanta and Chicago.

Background
Before the release of Maxwell's album, the singer performed an intimate show on August 6 in Detroit for the second of a series of small-venue dates to promote his anticipated next album Now, which is due out August 21. Seven of the 11 songs Maxwell and his 10-piece band performed during his one-hour "open rehearsal"—in front of a capacity crowd of 1,000 at St. Andrews Hall—came from the album, including the epic love ballad "Lifetime", a version of Kate Bush's "This Woman's Work", and the upbeat encore "Get To Know Ya."
Maxwell scheduled to perform seven concert dates in New York City between August 13 through the 25, with J Records new artist Alicia Keys as supporting act.

Alicia Keys will join soul man Maxwell for a 25-date, 14-city tour that kicks off August 13 in New York. Keys is touring behind her Songs in A Minor, her first album, which debuted at #1 on the Billboard albums chart. Throughout the tour, more dates were added in several cities across the U.S. with two final shows in December. Maxwell resumed touring in 2002, planning a mini summer tour in the U.S.

Opening Acts

Alicia Keys (USA—Leg 1)
Angie Stone (USA—Indianapolis)

Set list
 "Urban Suite" (Intro interlude)
 "Now/At the Party"
 "Sumthin' Sumthin'"
 "Everwanting:To Want you to Want Me"
 "Lifetime"
 "This Woman's Work"
 "Get to Know Ya"
 "Dancewitme"
 "W/As My Girl"
 "For Lovers Only"
 "Fortunate"
 "Changed"
 "...Til the Cops Come Knockin'"
 "You're the Kinda Woman"
 "Whenever Wherever Whatever" 
 "Suite Theme" (tease)
 "Ascension (Don't Ever Wonder)"

Band
Guitar: Wah Wah Watson

Tour dates

Note
 Not all 2002 U.S. tour dates my not be listed.

References

Maxwell (musician) concert tours
2001 concert tours